= Cristina Milani =

Swiss psychologist and writer

Cristina Cesarina Milani
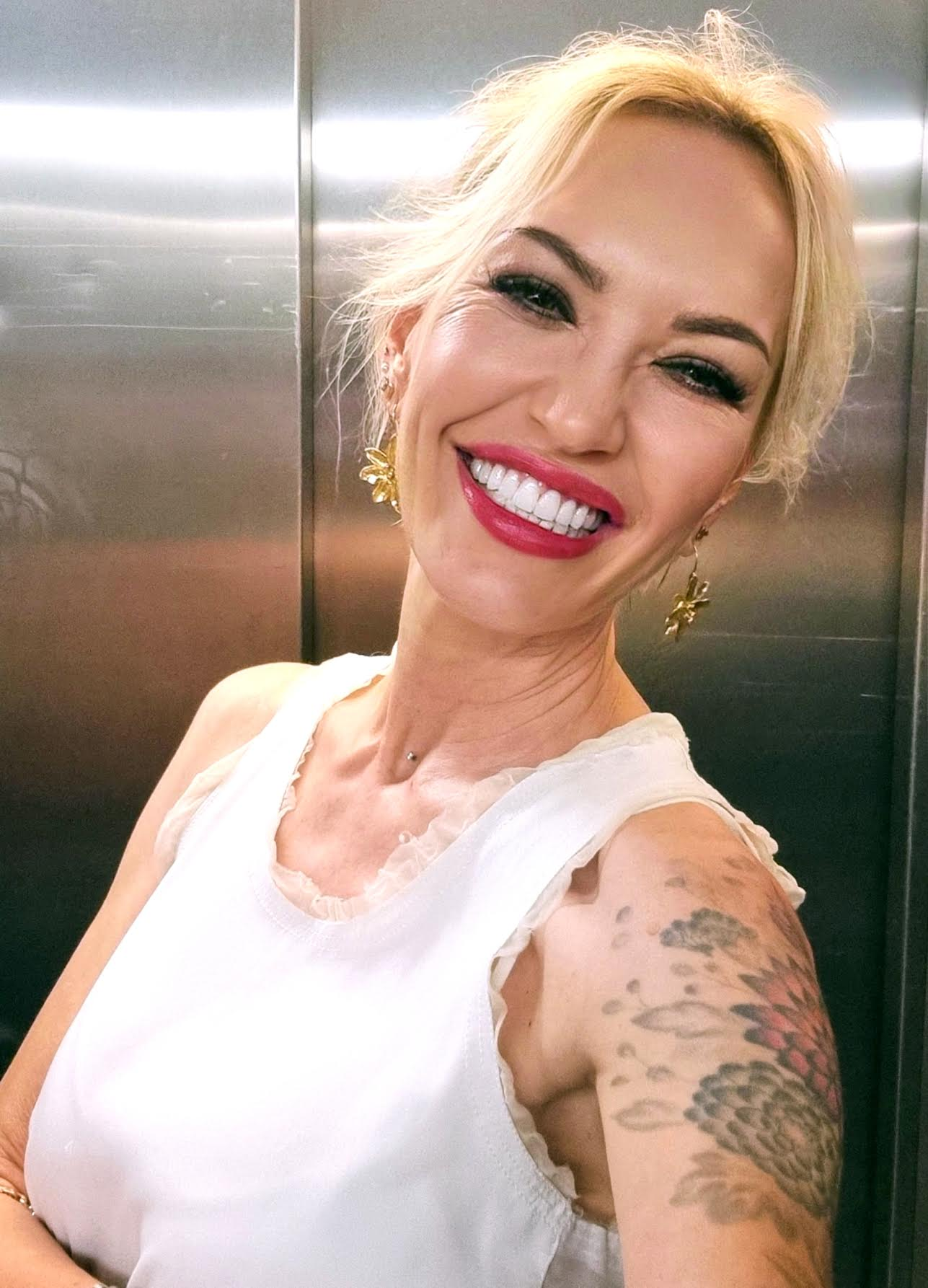
- Born: 1966 (age 59–60); Switzerland
- Website: cristinamilani.com

Cristina Cesarina Milani (born 1966) is a Swiss psychologist, writer, and entrepreneur. She was the president of World Kindness Movement (WKM) and founder of two non-profit organizations, Gentletude Switzerland and Gentletude Onlus (Italy). Cristina was also the founder & CEO of HeS-Human engineering Systems and co-founder of Work Style Magazine. She is the partner of GWH SA, a brand building company in Lugano, Switzerland, for which she has been working since 1999.

== Early life and career ==
Cristina was born in 1966 in Switzerland. She earned a bachelor's degree in psychology, a master's degree in communication, and another in cognitive behavioral sciences. In 1998, she founded HeS Human Engineering System a company with which she collaborated in the US and Asia with Great Places to Work International.

In 1999, she joined Gds Brand Consultancy, now GWH SA, a brand consultancy company (of which she was vice president and today one of the majority shareholders). She was also co-founder of the Work Style magazine

In 2011, she founded Gentletude Switzerland in Lugano and Gentletude Onlus in Milan, two NGOs with the aim of developing philanthropic projects.

In 2012, she became the representative of Switzerland in the World Kindness Movement. She was nominated vice president (2014–2017) and in 2017, during the General Assembly held in Seoul, she was nominated president, a position that she held until 2021 with the organization.

In 2019, she became a TEDx speaker. She often takes part in television programs like: RSI La Domenica, RSI Il Gioco del Mondo, RAI Porta a Porta, RSI Turné, RAI L'uomo della notte con Maurizio Costanzo, Corriere della sera online, TV8 Economia

== Bibliography ==
- A day of ordinary kindness (Ed. Pagine d'Arte, 2010) (Italian and English)
- La forza nascosta della gentilezza (Ed. Sperling&Kupfer, 2017).
- Diventare ambasciatore di gentilezza: Come adottare uno stile di vita gentile per migliorare il mondo e se stessi (Ed.Gentlebooks 2021)
